The 2008 Queensland Cup season was the 13th season of Queensland's top-level statewide rugby league competition run by the Queensland Rugby League. The competition, known as the Queensland Wizard Cup due to sponsorship from Wizard Home Loans featured 11 teams playing a 26-week long season (including finals) from March to September.

The Souths Logan Magpies won their first premiership after defeating the Ipswich Jets 24–18 at North Ipswich Reserve. Central Comets'  Nat Bowman was named the competition's Player of the Year, winning the Courier Mail Medal.

Teams 
Two new teams entered the Queensland Cup in 2008, as the competition expanded north with the Mackay Cutters and the Northern Pride. Mackay hadn't hosted a team since the 1996 season, while the Pride, based in Cairns, were represented by the Cairns Cyclones from 1996 to 2000. The two new clubs replaced the Aspley Broncos and North Queensland Young Guns, who withdrew from the competition.

With the loss of Aspley and the Young Guns, the Brisbane Broncos and North Queensland Cowboys formed new feeder club partnerships. The Broncos sent players to six different clubs and the Cowboys sent players to the Cutters and Pride, while the Canberra Raiders formed a partnership with the Souths Logan Magpies. 2008 marked the first season since 1997 that the Melbourne Storm were not affiliated with the Norths Devils, instead forming the Central Coast Storm who played in the NSW Cup.

Ladder

Regular season 

The 2008 Queensland Cup regular season featured 22 rounds, with one team receiving a bye in each round. Each team played 20 games and received two byes.

Final series

Grand Final 

Ipswich had their best regular season to date, finishing with their first minor premiership. They then defeated the Northern Pride in the major semi final to earn their second Grand Final appearance. Souths Logan, who finished second and qualified for the finals for just the second time, were upset by the Pride in Week 1 of the finals. In Week 2, they hosted and defeated Redcliffe before getting revenge on the Pride and defeating them 16–12 in the preliminary final to qualify for their first Grand Final.

First half 
Souths Logan got off to a brilliant start when they forced an error off the kickoff and scored in the second minute through prop Cy Lasscock. It took them just five minutes to extend their lead when hooker McKanah Gibson dived over from dummy half in almost the exact spot of their first try. After denying two Ipswich try scoring opportunities, the Magpies crossed for their third try of the game when Matt Templeman intercepted an Ian Lacey pass and sprinted away to score. With two minutes left in the half, Souths Logan converted a penalty goal from in front to lead 18-0.

Second half 
Down 18, Ipswich began their fightback with a try from hooker Michael Ryan just four minutes into the second half. In the 55th minute, the Jets cut the lead to six when centre Donald Malone pulled down a Lacey kick to score. Just a minute later, Ipswich completed the comeback when prop Aaron Sweeney scored under the posts to level the scores. A tense final 20 minutes followed, with Souths Logan being denied a try in the 65th minute and Ipswich missing a field goal from in front in the 78th minute. With 40 seconds left to play, Magpies' halfback Albert Talipeau put his centre Kyle Lodge through a gap close to the line. Lodge was cut down short by Jets' fullback Troy O'Sullivan but got up and scored after O'Sullivan couldn't complete the tackle. Referee Justin Eastwood checked with the video referee, who awarded the try. Josh White converted the try to seal the win and give Souths Logan their first Queensland Cup premiership.

End-of-season awards 
 Courier Mail Medal (Best and Fairest): Nat Bowman ( Central Comets)
 QANTAS Player of the Year (Coaches Award): Scott Smith ( Burleigh Bears)
 Coach of the Year: Kevin Walters ( Ipswich Jets)
 Rookie of the Year: Fred Tila ( Easts Tigers)
 Representative Player of the Year: Isaak Ah Mau ( Queensland Residents,  Ipswich Jets)

See also 

 Queensland Cup
 Queensland Rugby League

References 

2008 in Australian rugby league
Queensland Cup